Chengbei Subdistrict is a subdistrict of Lishi District, Lüliang, Shanxi, People's Republic of China, occupying the northern portion of the district as its name suggests. , it has 13 residential communities (社区) under its administration.

See also 
 List of township-level divisions of Shanxi

References 

Township-level divisions of Shanxi